Without You All Is Darkness (German: Ohne dich wird es Nacht) is a 1956 West German drama film directed by and starring Curd Jürgens. Eva Bartok, René Deltgen and Ursula Grabley also star.

The film's sets were designed by the art direction Fritz Maurischat and Ernst Schomer. It was shot at the Göttingen Studios and on location in Hamburg and Kassel.

Cast
 Eva Bartok as Gina Bergold 
 Curd Jürgens as Dr. Robert Kessler 
 René Deltgen as Charly Justin 
 Ernst Schröder as Arthur Wehrmann 
 Ursula Grabley as Hella - Bardame 
 Carl Wery as Roberts Vater 
 Karin Evans as Fräulein Bahlke 
 Hedwig Wangel as Julchen 
 Leonard Steckel as Dr. Bräuner 
 Wolfgang Neuss as Apotheker

References

Bibliography
 Victoria DeGrazia & Ellen Furlough. The Sex of Things: Gender and Consumption in Historical Perspective. University of California Press, 1996.

External links 
 

1956 films
1956 drama films
German drama films
West German films
1950s German-language films
Films directed by Curd Jürgens
Films about drugs
1950s German films
Films shot at Göttingen Studios
German black-and-white films